The 1953 Paris–Tours was the 47th edition of the Paris–Tours cycle race and was held on 4 October 1953. The race started in Paris and finished in Tours. The race was won by Jozef Schils.

General classification

References

1953 in French sport
1953
1953 Challenge Desgrange-Colombo
October 1953 sports events in Europe